Jieshi Diao Youlan or just "Solitary Orchid" ("Secluded Orchid" or "Elegant Orchid" in some translations) is the name of a piece of Chinese music or melody for the guqin which was composed during the 6th or 7th century, with the earliest preserved text dating from the 7th century, and is possibly the oldest surviving piece of written music in East Asia.

History
The manuscript was written during the early Tang Dynasty during the 7th century, and it is now found in Kyoto, Japan. It is believed to be a copy of an earlier manuscript and contains a lot of written 'corrections', mistakes and vagueness. Because it is damaged in some places, there has been much study into how it is played.

Notation

The manuscript of Youlan is written in a special old form of guqin notation, known as wenzi pu (lit. "written character notation").

Tonality
The melody is noted for its use of microtones, especially at the cadences at the end of each of its four sections when three tones between ti and do (and in the case of the third section, the halfway tone between ti and do is further divided) are used. This creates a mysterious effect that sounds modern to new listeners.

References
Please see: References section in the guqin article for a full list of references used in all qin related articles.

Notes

Guqin
Chinese traditional music